Marcabru (fl. 1130–1150) is one of the earliest troubadours whose poems are known. There is no certain information about him; the two vidas attached to his poems tell different stories, and both are evidently built on hints in the poems;  not on independent information.

According to the brief life in BnF ms. 12473, Marcabrun was from Gascony (details of the dialect of his poems support this) and was the son of a poor woman named Marcabrunela. This evidently comes from a reading of poem 293,18.

According to the longer biography in MS. Vat. Lat. 5232 Marcabru was abandoned at a rich man's door, and no one knew his origin. He was brought up by Aldric del Vilar, learned to make poetry from Cercamon, was at first nicknamed Pan-perdut and later Marcabru. He became famous, and the lords of Gascony, about whom he had said many bad things, eventually put him to death. This appears to be based on poems 16b,1 and 293,43 (an exchange between Aldric del Vilar and Marcabru) and guesswork; the link with Cercamon is doubted by modern scholars.

Forty-four poems are attributed to Marcabru, learned, often difficult, sometimes obscene, relentlessly critical of the morality of lords and ladies. He experimented with the pastorela, which he uses to point out the futility of lust. One tells of how the speaker's advances are reviled by a shepherdess on the basis of class. Another tells of how a man's attempt to seduce a woman whose husband was at the crusades is firmly rebuffed. He may also have originated the tenso in a debate with Uc Catola (as early as 1133) on the nature of love and the decline of courtly behaviour. Marcabru was a powerful influence on later poets who adopted the obscure trobar clus style. Among his patrons were William X of Aquitaine and, probably, Alfonso VII of León. Marcabru may have travelled to Spain in the entourage of Alfonso Jordan, Count of Toulouse, in the 1130s. In the 1140s he was a propagandist for the Reconquista and in his famous poem with the Latin beginning Pax in nomine Domini! he called Spain a lavador (washer) where knights could go to have their souls cleansed fighting the infidel.

Four monophonic melodies to accompany Marcabru's poetry survive; additionally, three melodies of poems that may be contrafacta of Marcabru's work may be attributed to him.


Notes

References

Sources

External links

Selected works, some with Italian translations, and vida at RIALTO
Complete works with English translation at trobar.org
Marcabru (fl. 1129–1150) at University of Washington faculty page

12th-century deaths
Gascons
12th-century French troubadours
Christians of the Second Crusade
People of the Reconquista
Year of birth unknown